Jiří Dadák (7 March 1926 in Valašské Meziříčí – 6 March 2014) was a Czechoslovak athlete who specialized in hammer throw.

Career
Dadák won a bronze medal in the 1950 European Athletics Championships in Brussels. Two years later, he represented Czechoslovakia at the Summer Olympics in Helsinki, where he finished fourth with a result of 56.81 meters. He took part in the 1954 European Athletics Championships in Bern, Switzerland, finishing in the ninth place (55.66 m).

Gallery

References

1926 births
2014 deaths
Czechoslovak male hammer throwers
Athletes (track and field) at the 1952 Summer Olympics
Olympic athletes of Czechoslovakia
People from Valašské Meziříčí
Sportspeople from the Zlín Region